Louis Marie Malle (30 October 1932 – 23 November 1995) was a French film director, screenwriter, and producer who worked in both French cinema and Hollywood. Described as "eclectic" and "a filmmaker difficult to pin down", Malle made documentaries, romances, period dramas, and thrillers. He often depicted provocative or controversial subject matter.

Malle's most famous works include the crime thriller Elevator to the Gallows (1958), the romantic drama The Lovers (1958), the World War II drama Lacombe, Lucien (1974), the period drama Pretty Baby (1978), the romantic crime film Atlantic City (1980), the dramedy My Dinner with Andre (1981), and the autobiographical Au revoir les enfants (1987). He also co-directed the landmark underwater documentary The Silent World with Jacques Cousteau, which won the 1956 Palme d'Or and the 1957 Academy Award for Best Documentary.

Malle is one of only four directors to have won the Golden Lion twice. His other accolades include three Césars, two BAFTAs, and three Oscar nominations. He was made a Fellow of the British Academy of Film and Television Arts in 1991.

Early life
Malle was born into a wealthy industrialist family in Thumeries, Nord, France, the son of Françoise (Béghin) and Pierre Malle.

During World War II, Malle attended a Catholic boarding school near Fontainebleau. As an 11-year-old he witnessed a Gestapo raid on the school, in which three Jewish students, including his close friend, and a Jewish teacher were rounded up and deported to Auschwitz. The school's headmaster, Père Jacques, was arrested for harboring them and sent to the concentration camp at Mauthausen. Malle depicted these events in his autobiographical film Au revoir les enfants (1987).

As a young man, Malle studied political science at Sciences Po from 1950 to 1952 (some sources incorrectly state that he studied at the Sorbonne) before turning to film studies at IDHEC.

Career 
Malle worked as co-director and cameraman with Jacques Cousteau on the documentary The Silent World (1956), which won an Oscar and the Palme d'Or at the 1956 Academy Awards and Cannes Film Festival, respectively. He assisted Robert Bresson on A Man Escaped (Un condamné à mort s'est échappé ou Le vent souffle où il veut, 1956) before making his first feature, Ascenseur pour l'échafaud in 1957 (released in the U.K. as Lift to the Scaffold and in the U.S. originally as Frantic, later as Elevator to the Gallows). A taut thriller featuring an original score by Miles Davis, Ascenseur pour l'échafaud made an international film star of Jeanne Moreau, at the time a leading stage actress of the Comédie-Française. Malle was 24 years old.

Malle's The Lovers (Les Amants, 1958), which also starred Moreau, caused major controversy due to its sexual content, leading to a landmark U.S. Supreme Court case about the legal definition of obscenity. In Jacobellis v. Ohio, a theater owner was fined $2,500 for obscenity. The Supreme Court overturned the decision, finding that the film was not obscene and hence constitutionally protected. But the court could not agree on a definition of "obscene", with Justice Potter Stewart famously saying, "I know it when I see it".

Malle is sometimes associated with the nouvelle vague, but his work does not directly fit in with or correspond to the auteurist theories that apply to the work of Jean-Luc Godard, François Truffaut, Claude Chabrol, Éric Rohmer and others, and he had nothing to do with Cahiers du cinéma. But Malle's work does exemplify some of the movement's characteristics, such as using natural light and shooting on location, and his film Zazie dans le Métro (Zazie in the Metro, 1960, an adaptation of the Raymond Queneau novel) inspired Truffaut to write Malle an enthusiastic letter.

Other films also tackled taboo subjects: The Fire Within centers on a man about to commit suicide, Le souffle au cœur (1971) deals with an incestuous relationship between mother and son, and Lacombe, Lucien (1974), co-written with Patrick Modiano, is about collaboration with the Nazis in Vichy France during World War II. The second of these earned Malle his first (of three) Oscar nominations for "Best Writing, Story and Screenplay Based on Factual Material or Material Not Previously Published or Produced".

Documentary on India
Malle visited India in 1968, and made the seven-part documentary series L'Inde fantôme: Reflexions sur un voyage and the documentary film Calcutta, which was released in cinemas. Concentrating on real India, its rituals and festivities, Malle fell afoul of the Indian government, which disliked his portrayal of the country, in its fascination with the pre-modern, and consequently banned the BBC from filming in India for several years. Malle later said his documentary on India was his favorite film.

Move to the U.S.
Malle later moved to the United States and continued to direct there. His later films include Pretty Baby (1978), Atlantic City (1980), My Dinner with Andre (1981), Crackers (1984), Alamo Bay (1985), Damage (1992) and Vanya on 42nd Street (1994, an adaptation of Anton Chekhov's play Uncle Vanya) in English; and Au revoir les enfants (1987) and Milou en Mai (May Fools in the U.S., 1990) in French. Just as his earlier films such as The Lovers helped popularize French films in the U.S., My Dinner with Andre was at the forefront of the rise of American independent cinema in the 1980s.

Towards the end of his life, cultural correspondent Melinda Camber Porter interviewed Malle extensively for The Times. In 1993, the interviews were included in her book Through Parisian Eyes: Reflections On Contemporary French Arts And Culture.

Personal life
Malle was married to actress Anne-Marie Deschodt from 1965 to 1967. He later had a son, Manuel Cuotemoc Malle (born 1971), with German actress Gila von Weitershausen, and a daughter, filmmaker Justine Malle (born 1974), with Canadian actress Alexandra Stewart.

Malle married actress Candice Bergen in 1980. They had one child, Chloé Françoise Malle, on 8 November 1985. Malle died of lymphoma, aged 63, at their home in Beverly Hills, California, on November 23, 1995.

Filmography

Feature films

Documentary films

Television

Awards and nominations 
Le Monde du silence (1956)
Cannes Film Festival Palme d'Or Winner
The Lovers (1958)
Venice Film Festival Special Jury Prize Winner
Le Feu follet (1963)
Venice Film Festival Special Jury Prize Winner
Venice Film Festival Italian Film Critics Award Winner
The Thief of Paris (1967)
5th Moscow International Film Festival official selection
Calcutta (1969)
Cannes Film Festival Official Selection
Melbourne International Film Festival: Grand Prix Winner
Murmur of the Heart (1971)
Cannes Film Festival Official Selection
Academy Award for Best Original Screenplay Nomination
Lacombe, Lucien (1974)
Academy Award for Best Foreign Language Film Nomination
Golden Globes Best Foreign Film Nomination
BAFTA Best Foreign Language Film Winner
British Academy of Film and Television Arts Best Director Nomination
Pretty Baby (1978)
Cannes Film Festival Technical Grand Prize Winner
Atlantic City (1981)
Venice Film Festival Golden Lion Winner
Academy Award for Best Director Nomination
Academy Award for Best Picture Nomination
Golden Globes Best Foreign Film Nomination
Golden Globes Best Director Nomination
BAFTA Best Director Winner
Crackers (1984)
Berlin Film Festival Official Selection
Goodbye, Children (1987)
Venice Film Festival Golden Lion Winner
Venice Film Festival OCIC Award Winner
Academy Award for Best Foreign Language Film Nomination
Academy Award for Best Original Screenplay Nomination
Golden Globes Best Foreign Film Nomination
BAFTA Best Director Winner
BAFTA Best Film Nomination
BAFTA Best Screenplay Nomination
Cesar Awards Best Film Winner
Cesar Awards Best Director Winner
Cesar Awards Best Screenplay Winner
European Film Awards Best Screenwriter Winner
European Film Awards Best Film Nomination
European Film Awards Best Director Nomination
May Fools (1990)
British Academy of Film and Television Arts Best Foreign Film Nomination

References

Further reading

External links

1932 births
1995 deaths
BAFTA fellows
Best Director BAFTA Award winners
Best Director César Award winners
David di Donatello winners
Deaths from cancer in California
Deaths from lymphoma
Directors of Golden Lion winners
Directors of Palme d'Or winners
European Film Award for Best Screenwriter winners
French expatriates in the United States
French film directors
French film producers
French screenwriters
People from Nord (French department)
Sciences Po alumni
20th-century French screenwriters